The 1938–39 season was the 66th season of competitive football in Scotland and the 49th season of the Scottish Football League. Due to the World War II the league was not officially competed for again until the 1946–47 season.

Scottish League Division One

Champions: Rangers

Scottish League Division Two

Scottish Cup

Clyde were winners of the Scottish Cup after a 4–0 win over Motherwell.

Other Honours

National

County

 * - aggregate over two legs

Highland League

Junior Cup

Rutherglen Glencairn were winners of the Junior Cup after a 1–0 win over Shawfield in the final.

Scotland national team

Scotland were joint winners of the 1939 British Home Championship with England and Wales

Key:
 (H) = Home match
 (A) = Away match
 BHC = British Home Championship

Notes and references

External links
Scottish Football Historical Archive

 
Seasons in Scottish football